The following is a list of grand viziers of Persia (Iran) until 1906, when the office of Prime Minister of Iran was created as a result of the Iranian Constitutional Revolution. There were different names for this office during different historical periods such as Wuzurg Framadar, Vizier, Sāheb Divān, Vizier of the Supreme Court (Vazir-e Divān-e A'lā), Grand vizier (Vazir-e A'zam), Premier (Shakhs-e Avval) and Sadr-e A'zam.

Wuzurg Framadar (224–651) 
 Abarsam, active during the reign of Ardashir I.
 Khosrow Yazdgerd (for Yazdgerd I)
 Mihr Narseh (for Yazdgerd I and Bahram V)
 Suren Pahlav (for Bahram V)
 Bozorgmehr (for Kavad I and Khosrow I)
 Izadgushasp (for Khosrow I)
 Piruz Khosrow (for Kavadh II and Ardashir III)
 Mah-Adhur Gushnasp (for Ardashir III)
 Farrukh Hormizd (for Boran)

Ulugh Bitikchi/Saheb Divan/Vizier (1256–1335) 
Ulugh Bitickhi
 Sayf al-Din Bitikchi (?–1263) (for Hulagu Khan)

Saheb Divan
 Shams al-Din Juvayni (1263–16 October 1284) (for Hulagu Khan, Abaqa Khan and Tekuder)

Vizier
 Buqa (15 September 1284–January 1289) (for Arghun Khan)

Saheb Divan
 Sa'ad al-Dawla Abhari (1289–1291) (for Arghun Khan)
 Sadr al-Din Ahmad Khaledi Zanjani (1st time) (18 November 1292–24 March 1295) (for Gaykhatu)

Vizier
 Jamal al-Din Ali Dastjerdani (1st time) (1295–1295) (for Baydu)
 Amir Nawrūz (5 October 1295–1295) (for Ghazan)
 Sharaf al-Din Mohammad Biabanaki Semnani (?–7 September 1296) (for Ghazan)
 Jamal al-Din Ali Dastjerdani (2nd time) (7 September 1296 – 5 October 1296) (for Ghazan)
 Sadr al-Din Ahmad Khaledi Zanjani (2nd time) (30 October 1296 – 30 April 1298) (for Ghazan)
 Rashid-al-Din Fazlollah Hamadani (1298–1316) and Sa'd-al-Din Mohammad Avaji (1298–1312) (for Ghazan and Öljaitü)
 Rashid-al-Din Fazlollah Hamadani (1298–1316) and Taj-al-Din Ali-Shah Jilani (1312 – June 1324) (for Öljaitü and Abu Sa'id Bahadur Khan)
 Ghias-al-din Mohammad Ali-Shahi (for Abu Sa'id Bahadur Khan)
 Rokn-al-Din Sa'en Fasavi (Nosrat-al-Din Adel Fasavi) (1324–?) (for Abu Sa'id Bahadur Khan)
 Demasq Kaja (?–24 August 1327) (for Abu Sa'id Bahadur Khan)
 Ghiyas-al-Din Mohammad Rashidi and Ala'-al-Din Mohammad Faryumadi (just for 8 months as a colleague of Ghiyas-al-Din) (for Abu Sa'id Bahadur Khan)
 Ghiyas-al-Din Mohammad Rashidi (for Abu Sa'id Bahadur Khan and Arpa Ke'un)

Vizier/Grand Vizier (1500–1732) 

Vizier
 Shams-al-Din Zakariya Kujuji (1500–1512) and Najm-al-Din Mahmud Jan Daylamite (1503–?) (for Ismail I)
 Mirak beg Daylamite (?–?) (for Ismail I)
 Shah-mir Daylamite (?–?) (for Ismail I)
 Kamal-al-Din Shah-Hossein Isfahani (1514–15 April 1523) (for Ismail I)
 Jalal al-Din Mohammad Kujuji (1523–1524) (for Ismail I and Tahmasp I)
 Qadi Jahan Qazvini (1st time) (1524–1525) (for Tahmasp I)
 Qavam-al-Din Jafar Savaji (1525–1531) (for Tahmasp I)
 Ahmad Beg Nur-e Kamal (?–?) (for Tahmasp I)
 Sa'd-al-Din Enayatallah Khuzani (1533–1535) and Mo'in-al-Din Yazdi (?–?) (for Tahmasp I)
 Qadi Jahan Qazvini (2nd time) (1535–1549) (for Tahmasp I)
 Ghias-al-Din Ali Shirazi (?–?) (for Tahmasp I)
 Aqa Mohammad Farahani (?–?) (for Tahmasp I)
 Jalal-al-Din Amir-Beg Kujuji (?–?) (for Tahmasp I)
 Mirza Beg Sabeqi Abhari (?–?) (for Tahmasp I)
 Masum Beg Safavi (?–1568) (for Tahmasp I)
 Seraj-al-Din Ali Qomi (1568–?) (for Tahmasp I)
 Jamal-al-Din Ali Tabrizi and Seyyed Hassan Farahani (simultaneously 1573–?) (for Tahmasp I)
 Mirza Shokrollah Isfahani (20 July 1576–13 June 1577) (for Tahmasp I and Ismail II)

Grand Vizier (E'temad-od-Dowleh)
 Mirza Salman Jaberi (13 June 1577–14 May 1583) (for Ismail I and Mohammad Khodabanda)
 Mirza Hedayatollah Saruni (1583–1585) (for Mohammad Khodabanda)
 Mirza Mohammad Kermani (1st time) (1585–1587) (for Mohammad Khodabanda)
 Mirza Shahvali Shirazi (1587–1589) (for Abbas I)
 Mirza Mohammad Kermani (2nd time) (1589–1589/90) (for Abbas I)
 Mirza Lotfollah Shirazi (1589/90–1590) (for Abbas I)
 Mirza Hatem Beg Nasiri Ordubadi (1590 – 28 May 1610) (for Abbas I)
 Mirza Taleb Khan Nasiri Ordubadi (1st time) (1610–1620) (for Abbas I)
 Salman Khan Ustajlu (1620–1623) (for Abbas I)
 Khalifeh Soltan (1st time) (1623–1631) (for Abbas I and Safi of Persia)
 Mirza Taleb Khan Nasiri Ordubadi (2nd time) (1623 – 28 July 1634) (for Safi of Persia)
 Saru Taqi (11 August 1634–1644) (for Safi of Persia and Abbas II)
 Khalifeh Soltan (2nd time) (1644–1653) (for Abbas II)
 Mohammad Beg the Armenian Tabrizi (1653–1661) (for Abbas II)
 Mirza Mohammad-Mehdi Karaki (1661–1669) (for Abbas II and Suleiman of Persia)
 Shaykh Ali Khan Zanganeh (1669–1671) (for Suleiman of Persia)

The office was vacant (1671–1672)
 Shaykh Ali Khan Zanganeh (1672–1688) (for Suleiman of Persia)

The office was vacant (1688–1690)
 Mohammad-Taher Vahid-e Qazvini (1690–1698) (for Suleiman of Persia and Sultan Husayn)
 Mohammad-Mo'men Khan Shamlu (1699–1707) (for Sultan Husayn)
 Shahqoli Khan Zanganeh (1707–1716) (for Sultan Husayn)
 Fath-Ali Khan Daghestani (1716 – 8 December 1720) (for Sultan Husayn)
 Mohammad-Qoli Khan Shamlu (1721 – 23 October 1722) (for Sultan Husayn)
 Amanollah Khan E'temad-od-Dowleh (1722 – 25 April 1725) (for Mahmud Hotak)
 Zele Khan E'temad-od-Dowleh (1725–1727) (for Ashraf Hotak)
 Mohammad-Amin Khan E'temad-od-Dowleh (1727–1729) (for Ashraf Hotak)
 Rajab-Ali Khan E'temad-od-Dowleh (1729–1732) (for Tahmasp II)

The office was vacant (1732–1750)

Grand Vizier (1750–1794)
Zakariya Khan Kazzazi (June 1750–1751) (for Ismail III)
Mohammad-Salim Khan Afshar (1751–?1752) (for Ismail III)
Zakariya Khan Kazzazi (?1752–?1756) (for Ismail III)
Mirza Aqil Alavi (?1758–1763) (for Karim Khan Zand)
Mirza Jafar Isfahani (1763–1779) (for Karim Khan Zand)
Mirza Rabi Isfahani (?–1785) (for Ali-Morad Khan Zand)
Mirza Mohammad-Hossein Farahani (1785–?) (for Jafar Khan Zand and Lotf-Ali Khan Zand)

Grand Vizier/Sadr-e A'zam/Premier (Qajar Dynasty)

See also
List of prime ministers of Iran
Persian name
Prime Minister of Iran
Vizier
The history of the parliament in Iran
Board of Directors of the Islamic Consultative Assembly
Women in the Parliament of Iran

References

Sources
 
For a full list of Viziers of Iran in the last 2000 years, see: "Iranian Viziers: From Bozorgmehr to Amir Kabir" (وزیران ایرانی از بزرگمهر تا امیر کبیر) by Abdolrafi' Haqiqat (عبدالرفیع حقیقت). Perry–Castañeda Library collection DS 271 F34 1995
Mohammad Taghi Bahar, Taarikh-e Mokhtasar-e Ahzaab-e Siaasi-e Iraan (A Short History of Political Parties of Iran), Amirkabir, 1978.
Encyclopædia Iranica Online, available at www.iranica.com
The Persian Encyclopedia

Iran, List of Prime Ministers of
Government of Iran
Political history of Iran
Prime ministers